The LG G1500 or G1500 is a GSM mobile phone made by LG Electronics with a monochrome LCD display. It supports GPRS, which is very notable because other handsets of its category never include a GPRS feature.

G 1500